Frederick or Fred Hess could refer to: 

Frederick M. Hess (born 1968), American education writer 
Fred Hess (1944–2018), American jazz saxophonist
Fred Hess (politician) (1858–1925), Wisconsin state assemblyman

See also
Ferd J. Hess (1848-1928), American politician and farmer